Year of No Light is a French post-metal band formed in Bordeaux in 2001. On their 2006 debut album Nord, the band combined a dark and aggressive sludge metal sound with psychedelic atmospheres inspired by post-rock and shoegazing. In 2008, they underwent a significant line-up change, replacing their vocalist by a third guitarist and a second drummer to become an instrumental sextet. Thereafter, Year of No Light integrated black metal, doom metal, drone and dark ambient influences on the albums Ausserwelt (2010) and Tocsin (2013).

History 

Year of No Light was founded in September 2001 in Bordeaux, France by Johan Sébenne, Bertrand Sébenne, Jérôme Alban and Christophe Mora  (Finger Print, Undone). Since its conception, Year Of No Light was never a "top priority" band but rather an instrumental side project. After one year of rehearsal, Christophe Mora left the band. Pierre Anouilh succeeded him. One month later, the band played live for the first time.

From 2002 to 2003, they played local shows in Bordeaux. In September 2003, Julien Perez joined the band as a singer. One month later, the new line up played its first show. Year Of No Light still remains an "active" side project due to all of the musical activities of the vast majority of its members.

The band finally recorded a demo in June 2004. After its release, the group toured Spain and Basque Country. Following the good feedbacks surrounding the Demo (one review describing Year Of No Light as "The Cure playing Sludge"), the band worked on its first album during the summer 2005. In September 2005, they recorded Nord with Serge Morattel at Geneva, Switzerland. The following year, Nord was released to positive reviews. Year Of No Light began to tour more often in 2006 and played at the famous Dour Festival in 2007. The same year, Nord was reissued on Crucial Blast, for the CD version, and Cavity Records for the LP.

In 2008, Year Of No Light toured Europe and played at the prestigious Roadburn and Hellfest festivals. After several collaborations with acts like Nadja and Fear Falls Burning and some splits recordings, they discarded their singer. At the end of the summer, Year Of No Light becomes a six piece entity with two drummers, one bassist, and three guitarists, backed by some vintage synths. Shiran Kaïdine, from Monarch!, and Mathieu Mégemont, from Aérôflôt, joined the band respectively as third guitarist and second drummer.

In September 2009, the band began to record Ausserwelt in Bordeaux with Cyrille Gachet. In April 2010, following the release of Ausserwelt on Conspiracy, Year Of No Light toured Europe with Irish black metallers Altar of Plagues. The following month, the band worked on a soundtrack for Dreyer's Vampyr, and performed it for the first time, on May 28, 2010, at Barbey Theatre in Bordeaux. In February 2011, Year Of No Light played Vampyr in Tallinn, Estonia. The following months, after having recorded new material for upcoming splits, they toured Europe and played two sets at Roadburn: a classical gig (including the totality of Ausserwelt) and the Vampyr performance.

Functioning sometimes like an open collective, Year Of No Light used to punctually be part of sonic performances in collaboration with contemporary artists. The group worked with French contemporary artist Christian Vialard for a video installation reinventing Yves Klein's . The installation can be seen during an exhibition, Le Temps de l’Ecoute, at la Villa Arson, Nice, from June 24 to October 30, 2011.

In late 2014, Year Of No Light embarked on their first ever US tour, playing eleven dates. Sludge metal band Take Over And Destroy opened for the first nine shows with various other openers, booked in west coast and southwestern states. The tour then concluded with two nights at New York venue Saint Vitus. The band however performed as a five-piece during this tour, with the band citing guitarist Pierre Anouilh's visa issues preventing him from touring.

Members 
Current
Jérôme Alban – guitar (2001–present) (Baron Oufo, Donald Washington, Metronome Charisma)
Bertrand Sébenne – drums, percussions, keyboards (2001–present) (Metronome Charisma)
Johan Sébenne – bass guitar, keyboards, electronics (2001–present) (Altaïr Temple, Nexus Sun)
Pierre Anouilh – guitar (2002–present) (Déjà Mort)
Shiran Kaïdine – guitar (2008–present) (Monarch!)
Mathieu Mégemont – drums, keyboards, synthesizer (2008–present) (Aérôflôt)

Former
Christophe Mora – guitar (2001–2002) (Finger Print, Undone)
Julien Perez – vocals, keyboards (2003–2008) (Metronome Charisma)

Discography

Studio albums

Live albums

Split albums, EPs and collaborations 
Karysun / Year of No Light Split 7" EP (2009)
Year Of No Light w/ Fear Falls Burning & Nadja (split w/ Machu Picchu Mother Future) LP (2009)
3 way Split (split w/ East of the Wall & Rosetta) LP (2009)
s/t (split w/ Altar of Plagues) LP (2012)
s/t (split w/ Thisquietarmy) LP (2012)
s/t (split w/ Mars Red Sky) LP (2012)
s/t (split w/ Bagarre Générale) LP (2015)

Demo 
Demo CDR (2004)

Soundtracks 
 (2010)
Mademoiselle... (original soundtrack performed live for the exhibition Rupture mon amour) (2010)
Vampyr (original soundtrack performed live) (2010–2012)
Les Maîtres Fous(original soundtrack performed live) (2012-01-06)

Compilations

References

External links 

Post-metal musical groups
Sludge metal musical groups
Drone metal musical groups
French black metal musical groups
French post-rock groups
Musical groups from Bordeaux
Musical groups established in 2001
2001 establishments in France